Scythropiodes triangulus is a moth in the family Lecithoceridae. It was described by Kyu-Tek Park and Chun-Sheng Wu in 1997. It is found in the Chinese provinces of Hainan, Fujian, Guangdong and Jiangxi.

The wingspan is about 23 mm. The forewings are pale yellow with small discal cells near the base, at one-third and near the end. The wings are scattered with brown scales beyond one-third and there are six to eight brown spots between the veins from before the apex to the tornus along the termen. The hindwings are yellowish white.

Etymology
The species name is derived from Latin curvus (meaning bent).

References

Moths described in 1997
Scythropiodes